Ernest Alfred Stautner (April 20, 1925 – February 16, 2006) was a German-American professional football player and coach. He played as a defensive tackle in the National Football League for the Pittsburgh Steelers. He also served as a coach for the Steelers, Washington Redskins and Dallas Cowboys. He played college football at Boston College. Stautner was inducted into the Pro Football Hall of Fame in 1969.

Early years
Born in Prienzing near Cham, Bavaria in Germany, Stautner's family immigrated to East Greenbush, New York when he was three years old. He attended Columbia High School and the Vincentian Institute. He served in the United States Marine Corps during World War II (1943–46).

After the war, he enrolled at Boston College, where he was a four-year starter as an offensive and defensive tackle. He also handled the team's kickoff and extra point duties. One of his teammates was future Pro Football Hall of Famer Art Donovan. He earned a bachelor's degree in psychology in 1950.

In 1973, he was inducted into the Boston College Varsity Club Athletic Hall of Fame.

Professional career
Stautner was selected by the Pittsburgh Steelers in the second round (22nd overall) of the 1950 NFL Draft. He played his entire career with the Steelers,  from 1950 to 1963. Despite being small even for his day at 6-1 and 235 pounds, he distinguished himself as one of the best defensive linemen of his era, as he became the cornerstone of the Steelers' bruising defense.

Stautner was named to nine Pro Bowls in his 14-year career and only missed six games. He also made All-NFL in 1955, 1956, 1958, 1959. He retired as the career leader in safeties with three and ranked third in fumble recoveries with 23. He moved to defensive end in the later years of his career and also saw spot service at offensive guard.

In the book Passion for Sports by The Sporting News, former teammate Andy Russell shares an anecdote that highlights Stautner's  toughness.  Russell, then a rookie playing on a team that would eventually finish in fourth place in what would be Stautner's final season, sees the grizzled veteran return to the huddle holding one of his hands in the other.  Russell looks down and sees that Stautner has a compound fracture of the thumb; one of his thumb bones is visibly sticking out of his skin.  Russell is the only one who notices, and Stautner says only, "What's the play?"  Then he plays the rest of the defensive series.  When the defense returns to the sideline, Russell watches Stautner, thinking that surely he must seek medical attention now.  Instead, Stautner says to someone, "Give me some tape."  Then Stautner taped up his hand into a club, and he played the rest of the game.

The NFL did not recognize quarterback sacks as an official stat at the time he retired, but he still finished with three career safeties (tied for the lead in league history) and 23 recovered fumbles (third in league history). The Steelers never made the playoffs during his career. He only missed six games during his 14-year career, despite suffering multiple cracked ribs, nose fractures, broken fingers and two broken shoulders.

On October 25, 1964, Stautner became the first player to have his number (70) formally retired by the Steelers. He was elected to the Steelers 50th anniversary team in 1982 and posthumously by the Pittsburgh Steeler fans to the Steelers 75th Anniversary All-Time Team in November 2007. He was inducted into the inaugural class of the Steelers' Hall of Honor in 2017.

On September 13, 1969, Stautner was inducted into the Pro Football Hall of Fame in his first year of eligibility.

Coaching career
From 1963 to 1964 he was a player-coach with the Pittsburgh Steelers. In 1965 he was the defensive line coach for the Washington Redskins.

From 1966 to 1988, he was an assistant coach with the Dallas Cowboys, and served as the team's defensive coordinator from 1973 to 1988. He was instrumental in the development of defensive players such as Randy White and Ed "Too Tall" Jones. He also contributed to the emergence of the team's famed "Doomsday" and "Doomsday II" defenses.

Stautner stayed on with the Cowboys from 1988 to 1989 as a scout. He coached the Dallas Texans, an Arena Football League team in their first season of play in 1990, guiding the franchise to an appearance in the ArenaBowl IV and earning the league's Coach-of-the-Year award.

Stautner was the defensive line coach for the Denver Broncos from 1991 to 1994.  While with the Broncos, he coached under both Dan Reeves and Wade Phillips. From 1995 to 1997, he returned to Germany to become head coach of the Frankfurt Galaxy of NFL Europe. He would guide the team to two consecutive World Bowls in 1995 and 1996, winning in 1995.

Head coaching record

Personal life
According to Cinema Treasures, Stauter is a former owner of the Sara-Placid Drive-In Theater in North Elba, New York.

Stautner, Matt Snell, Mickey Spillane, and drummer Buddy Rich each appeared in their own Miller Lite Beer commercial as the product was launched in 1973. This was the first set of ads that spawned the wildly successful Less Filling, Tastes Great campaign.

Stautner died at a Carbondale, Colorado nursing home at age 80 from complications of Alzheimer's disease. He is buried in Texas.

References

External links
 Pro Football Hall of Fame
 Boston College bio

1925 births
2006 deaths
American football defensive ends
American football defensive tackles
American football offensive guards
Boston College Eagles football players
Dallas Cowboys coaches
Dallas Cowboys scouts
Dallas Texans (Arena) coaches
Neurological disease deaths in Colorado
Deaths from Alzheimer's disease
Denver Broncos coaches
Eastern Conference Pro Bowl players
Frankfurt Galaxy coaches
German emigrants to the United States
German players of American football
National Football League defensive coordinators
National Football League players with retired numbers
People from Cham, Germany
Sportspeople from the Upper Palatinate
Pittsburgh Steelers coaches
Pittsburgh Steelers players
Pro Football Hall of Fame inductees
Sportspeople from Albany, New York
United States Marines
Washington Redskins coaches
United States Marine Corps personnel of World War II